Hahaya-Aéroport is a village on the island of Grande Comore (Ngazidja) in the Comoros. According to the 2016 census, the village had a population of 5143.

Hahaya is the location of Prince Said Ibrahim International Airport, the main airport serving the Comoros.

References

Populated places in Grande Comore